The Second Era of Northern Domination refers to the second period of Chinese rule in Vietnamese history, from the 1st century to 6th century AD, during which present-day northern Vietnam (Jiaozhi) was governed by various Chinese dynasties. This period lasted about 500 years.

History

Eastern Han dynasty
After suppressed the Trưng sisters in 44 AD, Ma Yuan continued his crackdown on the Lac Viet resistance and their society. Lac lords who had joined the Trung sisters, who had submitted or surrendered to Ma Yuan would be spared, those who disobeyed were beheaded.  Direct imperial government now was imposed on the region for the first time. Some of 20,000 Chinese soldiers had settled in northern Vietnam to help rebuild the Han administration, living along with around 900,000 local people. By the second and third century, local sites and artifacts often contain both Viet and Han styles, include Han-style tomb bricks and Dong Son artifacts such as bronze drums. Chopsticks, paper, writing brushes, the concept of household, tomb,... were introduced into indigenous society (presumably included Vietic speakers) during the Western Han or Eastern Han period. Although had adjusted local cultures, the Chinese didn't force the locals to adopt Chinese life style. From the Han to the Tang, Imperial Chinese had supported for the political alliances with the locally based elite–the local chiefs–which were powerful and wealthy. The Chinese court often gave them official positions in order to obtain profits from them.

In 157, local leader Chu Đạt in Jiuzhen attacked and killed the Chinese magistrate, then marched north with an army of four to five thousand. The governor of Jiuzhen, Ni Shi, was killed. The Han general of Jiuzhen, Wei Lang, gathered an army and defeated Chu Đạt, beheading 2,000 rebels.

In 159 and 161, Indian merchants arrived Jiaozhi and paid tribute to the Han government.

In 166, a Roman trade mission arrived Jiaozhi, bringing "tribute" (from the Chinese perspective)  to the Han, which "were likely bought from local markets" of Rinan and Jiaozhi.

In 178, Wuhu people (烏滸) under Liang Long sparked a revolt against the Han in Hepu and Jiaozhi. Liang Long spread his revolt to all northern Vietnam, Guangxi and central Vietnam as well, attracting all non-Chinese ethnic groups in Jiaozhi to join. In 181, the Han empire sent general Zhu Juan to deal with the revolt. In June 181 Liang Long was captured and beheaded, and his rebellion was suppressed.

Introduced by Indian merchants via sea, by late Han period, Buddhism quickly became the most predominant religion in Northern Vietnam, whereas the Dâu Temple (circa. 2nd century AD) was the first Buddhist temple in Vietnam. In 177, Shi Xie became the prefect of Jiaozhi province.

In 100, Cham people in Xianglin (Tượng Lâm) county (near modern-day Huế) revolted against the Han rule due to high taxes. The Cham plundered and burned down the Han centers. The Han respond by putting down the rebellion, executed their leaders and granting Xianglin a two-year tax respite. In 136 and 144, Cham people again launched another two rebellions which provoked mutinies in the imperial army from Jiaozhi and Jiuzhen, then rebellion in Jiaozhi. The governor of Jiaozhi, according to Kiernan, "lured them to surrender" with "enticing words."

In 192, Cham people in Tượng Lâm led by Khu Liên successful revolted against the Han dynasty. Khu Liên found the independent kingdom of Lâm Ấp.

Three Kingdoms era
Sĩ Nhiếp (Shi Xie) was the governor of Jiaozhi at the end of the Eastern Han dynasty. When China plunged into civil war, Si Nhiep ruled Jiaozhi as an independent warlord from 187 to 226. He pledged allegiance to Sun Quan forces in 210 and later became a vassal of Eastern Wu, himself received the title "Marquis of Longbian". In 227, Eastern Wu forces killed his son Shi Hui (士徽), ending the Shi rule of Jiaozhi.

When the Eastern Han dynasty split into the Three Kingdoms in 220, Jiaozhi was under the control of the state of Wu. In 226 Sun Quan divided Jiaozhi into two separated provinces, Chiao-chou (included northern Vietnam and small portion of Hepu) and Kuangchou. The Wu regime was harsh. Turmoil plagued the southern commanderies by the mid third century. In 231, people in Jiuzhen revolted but was "pacified" by a Wu general. In 248, Lâm Ấp forces invaded from the south, seized most of Rinan, and marched on into Jiuzhen, provoking major uprisings there and in Jiaozhi. In Jiuzhen, a Lạc Việt woman named Triệu Ẩu (Lady Triệu) led a rebellion against the Wu in the same year, but was suppressed by Lu Yin.

Jin-Wu war

In 263, Lu Hung (呂興), a prefecture in Jiaozhou, gained supports from local people and soldiers, murdered Wu administrators Sun Hsu (孫諝) and Teng Hsun (鄧荀), then sent envoys to Cao Wei requesting military assistance. Jiaozhi, Jiuzhen and Rinan were transferred to Wei. In 265, Jin dynasty (266–420) replaced Cao Wei, immediately sent Yang Chi to annex Jiaozhou with local supports. In 268, Wu sent two generals, Liu Chun and Hsiu Tse to reconquer Jiaozhou, but were repelled by Jin armies. In 270 Jin and Wu armies clashed in Hepu. The Wu general, Tao Huang contacted with Luong Ky, a local commander collaborating with the Jin and convinced him to side with the Wu, enabled the Wu army to recapture Jiaozhi's ports and main towns in 271. Fighting continued in the countryside until 280, when Jin destroyed Wu, reunifying China. The war devastated the region as number of households in northern Vietnam fell from 64,700 in 140 AD to around 25,600 by the Western Jin dynasty period.

Jin dynasty and Southern dynasties

In the early period of Jin dynasty, the imperial court favored the southern trade networks with prosperity kingdoms of Funan and Lâm Ấp. Along with this brief peacetime "boom" in the southern trade, Jiaozhi and Jiuzhen enjoyed some autonomy from China until
the 320s. In 312 rebels and imperial army fought each other with ferocity over Jiaozhi and Jiuzhen. Frustrated by the difficulty of trade, Lâm Ấp itself resorted from 323 to seaborne raids on northern ports in Jiaozhou. Though defeated in 399, Lâm Ấp continued its raids on Jiaozhi and Jiuzhen for two decades. A Chinese rebel army from Zhejiang briefly seized Jiaozhi's capital in 411. In 432, Phạm Dương Mại II of Lâm Ấp sent an embassy to the court of Liu Song asking for the appointment of Prefect of Jiao, which was declined.

During the Jin dynasty and Six dynasties period of China, the Li-Lao people extended their territories right along the south coast of modern Guangdong and Guangxi, in a swath of land to the east of the Red River Delta and south and west of the Pearl River Delta, occupied the overland roads between Guangzhou and Jiaozhou. The people of Li-Lao country put anyone traveled through their territories in dangers.

Rebellions broke out in Jiaozhou from 468 to 485, and in 506 and 515 under Liang dynasty.

In 541, Lý Bôn, a leader of the Li clan which had Sinitic ancestry, revolted against the Liang. In 544 he defeated the Liang and proclaimed himself Emperor of Nán Yuè with reign era Thiên-đức.  He named the new kingdom "Vạn Xuân" (萬春, "Eternal Spring"). Jiaozhou briefly became independence from the Chinese dynasties. In 545, Chen Baxian led the Liang army attack Jiaozhou, forced Lý Bôn fled west into the mountains above the Red River, where he was killed by Lao highlanders in 548.

Culture

Due to the political instability of the Chinese empire from 3rd to 6th century, much of the Vietnamese countryside was indirectly ruled, and indigenous customs and relations between the sexes persisted. Women played important roles in indigenous religious rites, including water rituals. International trade through Maritime Silk Road from late AD 100s to 500s brought Dong Son bronze drums from northern Vietnam to far as eastern Indonesia, Papua and the Moluccas. Buddhists from India, known to the Chinese as Hu, had arrived in Vietnam in AD 100s. Buddhism flourished within the region under Shi Xie. In contrast to Confucianism, Buddhism had deep roots in the Vietnamese psyche. Persian and Sogdian merchants also traveled to the Vietnamese coast; the region was the home of Kang Senghui, a Sogdian Buddhist monk who translated Buddhist texts into Chinese.

Uprisings
Local rebellions were organized by:
Chu Đạt 156–160
Lương Long 178–181
Khu Liên 192, who founded the Champa kingdom.
Triệu Chỉ 299–319
Lương Thạch 319–323
Lý Trường Nhân and Lý Thúc Hiến 468–485

See also
Timeline of Vietnam under Chinese rule

References

Bibliography

Articles

Books

Further reading
 

43 establishments
544 disestablishments
China–Vietnam relations
Jin dynasty (266–420)
Northern and Southern dynasties
Three Kingdoms
Wars involving Vietnam
Wars involving the Han dynasty